NGC 121 is a globular cluster in the Small Magellanic Cloud, in the constellation of Tucana. It was first discovered by John Herschel on September 20, 1835. The compiler of the New General Catalogue, John Louis Emil Dreyer, described this object as "pretty bright, pretty small, little extended, very gradually brighter middle".

References

External links 
 

Globular clusters
0121
Small Magellanic Cloud
Astronomical objects discovered in 1835
Tucana (constellation)